Guédiawaye is an arrondissement of Guédiawaye  in Dakar Region in Senegal.

References 

Arrondissements of Senegal